"Grace" is a song by Scottish singer-songwriter Lewis Capaldi. It was released as a digital download on 21 September 2018 via Virgin Records as the second single from his second extended play Breach and the fourth single from his debut studio album Divinely Uninspired to a Hellish Extent. The song peaked at number nine on the UK Singles Chart.

Music video
A music video to accompany the release of "Grace" was first released onto YouTube on 21 September 2018 at a total length of three minutes and thirty-two seconds. The video shows Lewis filling in for a friend at a local Gentleman's Club. It took inspiration from the dance scenes in the film Napoleon Dynamite and the series I'm Alan Partridge.

Capaldi later recreated the choreography onstage with male dancers while performing the song at his show in London in November 2018.

Track listing

Charts

Weekly charts

Year-end charts

Certifications

Release history

Usage in media
The song made an appearance in the 22nd episode of the medical drama series Grey's Anatomy's 15th season.

References

2018 songs
2018 singles
Lewis Capaldi songs
Songs written by Nick Atkinson
Songs written by Lewis Capaldi
Songs written by Edd Holloway
Virgin Records singles